The third series of Gladiators aired in the UK from 3 September to 31 December 1994.

Gladiators

This was the only series of Gladiators in which there were no changes to the Gladiator line-up. As such there were no changes to the opening credits and, despite the series’ popularity, there were no new photoshoots for promotional materials, with the photography from the 1993 series re-used for the programmes and merchandise.

Episodes

 Rachel slipped off her sky bike awkwardly during Joust with Scorpio and broke her back when she landed on the crash mat, which forced her to retire before the final event.
 Rowan was invited back to take part after making in through to the quarter-finals the previous year but being forced to pull out due to food poisoning.
 Panther picked up an injury against Erika on tilt and had to withdraw from the competition. Zodiac replaced her for the second pull.
 Lisa injured her foot on some stairs after training for her quarter-final and had to pull out. Katie replaced her as the highest-scoring female loser from the heats.
 Shadow came in with a high tackle on Sam in the opening seconds of Powerball, injuring Sam in the process and sending him to A&E. Phil replaced him as the loser with the fastest eliminator time from the semi-finals.
 These events had the female Gladiators against the male contenders.
 In these special episodes, there were 6 contenders with 2 being eliminated after event 4 (event 3 in the Fighting Forces special) and another 2 being eliminated after event 5.

References

1994 British television seasons
series three